The 2008–09 Argentine Torneo Argentino A was the fourteenth season of third division professional football in Argentina. A total of 25 teams competed; the champion was promoted to Primera B Nacional.

Club information

Zone A

1 Play their home games at Estadio José María Minella.

Zone B

Zone C

First stage

As Zone 3 had 9 teams and Zones 1 and 2 8 teams, each team of Zone 1 played against 1 team of Zone 2 to complete the fixture.

Zone A

Zone B

Zone C

Final stage

Group A

Group B

Championship final

Promotion/relegation playoff B Nacional-Torneo Argentino A

C.A.I remained in the Primera B Nacional by winning the playoff.

Relegation playoff

|-
!colspan="5"|Relegation/promotion playoff 1

|-
!colspan="5"|Relegation/promotion playoff 2

Crucero del Norte was promoted to 2009–10 Torneo Argentino A by winning the playoff and Alvarado was relegated to 2009–10 Torneo Argentino B.
Sportivo Belgrano was promoted to 2009–10 Torneo Argentino A by winning the playoff and Gimnasia y Esgrima (Mza) was relegated to 2009–10 Torneo Argentino B.

See also
2008–09 in Argentine football

References

Torneo Argentino A seasons
3